Jannie "Jan" Habig is a South African rally driver and six-time champion in the South African National Rally Championship. He competed in the 2012 WRC season at Rally GB, having scored points there in 1994, as well as being ranked the first of the ARC-registered drivers in Rally South Africa 2013. He is South Africa's third most successful rally driver.

His co-driver is now Richard Paisley since 2011. Before then, it was Douglas Judd who navigated him to six South African titles.

References

External links
 WRC Results (eWRC)
 Website

Living people
South African rally drivers
World Rally Championship drivers
Year of birth missing (living people)

M-Sport drivers